Froxlor is a web hosting control panel. In 2015, it contained a database security vulnerability which was fixed.

See also 
 net2ftp

References 

Web server management software